Bo Holten  (born 22 October 1948) is a Danish composer and conductor.

He has been the principal conductor for the vocal ensembles Ars Nova (Copenhagen) and Musica Ficta (Denmark), as well as guest-conductor for the BBC Singers. He was the principal conductor for the Flemish Radio Choir (Vlaams Radio  Koor) in Brussels until 2012.

As a composer he has written more than 100 works, including 6 operas, 2 musicals, 2 symphonies, and 5 solo concertos. He has also composed several film scores, amongst them the music for Lars Von Trier's The Element of Crime.

Notable works
 Sinfonia concertante for Cello & Orchestra (1987)
 Concerto for clarinet and orchestra (1990)
 Wisdom and Folly, choir (1993)
 Operation Orfeo, opera (1993)
 The Marriage of Heaven and Hell (Holten), choir (1992–95)
 Gesualdo, Opera (2003)
 The Physician-In-Ordinary's Visit (Livlægens Besøg), Opera (2008)

External links
 Biography at Edition Wilhelm Hansen (publisher)
 Biography at Danish Music Info
 Biography at bachcantatas.com

1948 births
Living people
20th-century classical composers
20th-century conductors (music)
20th-century Danish male musicians
21st-century classical composers
21st-century conductors (music)
21st-century male musicians
Danish classical composers
Danish male classical composers
Danish conductors (music)
Male conductors (music)